The 2021–22 season is Al-Faisaly's 13th non-consecutive season in the Pro League and their 68th season in existence. The club will participate in the Pro League, the King Cup, the AFC Champions League and the Saudi Super Cup.

The season covers the period from 1 July 2021 to 30 June 2022.

Players

Squad information

Out on loan

Transfers and loans

Transfers in

Transfers out

Loans out

Pre-season

Competitions

Overview

Goalscorers

Last Updated: 27 June 2022

Assists

Last Updated: 27 June 2022

Clean sheets

Last Updated: 23 June 2022

References

Al-Faisaly FC seasons
Faisaly